Hans Hess (born 1902, date of death unknown) was a German bobsledder who competed in the late 1920s. He won a bronze medal in the five-man event at the 1928 Winter Olympics in St. Moritz. This was the first medal Germany had ever earned at the Winter Olympics.

References
 Bobsleigh five-man Olympic medalists for 1928
 Hans Hess' profile at Sports Reference.com

1902 births
Year of death missing
German male bobsledders
Bobsledders at the 1928 Winter Olympics
Olympic bobsledders of Germany
Olympic bronze medalists for Germany
Olympic medalists in bobsleigh
Medalists at the 1928 Winter Olympics